The following lists events that happened during 1970 in the self-declared Republic of Rhodesia.

Incumbents

 President: Clifford Dupont (from 2 March 1970)
 Prime Minister: Ian Smith

Events

February

 17 February - Decimal Day in Rhodesia - the Rhodesian dollar is introduced to replace the Rhodesian pound.

March

 2 March - Rhodesia becomes a self-declared republic, but it is not recognized by the international community. Rhodesia remains legally a British colony in international law.
 17 March - Britain and United States use their veto rights in the United Nations Security Council to avoid implementation of complete mandatory sanctions on Rhodesia.

May

 21 May - Ian Smith, Prime Minister of Rhodesia and John Vorster, Prime Minister of South Africa hold private talks.

Births
January 24 — Neil Johnson, cricketer
 March 15 — Crispen Mutakanyi, middle distance runner

 
Years of the 20th century in Zimbabwe
Rhodesia
1970s in Rhodesia
Rhodesia